The Selinountas is a river in Achaea, Greece. Its source is on Mount Erymanthos, near the village Kato Vlasia in southern Achaea. It flows in generally northeastern direction, through the municipalities Kalavryta and Aigialeia. It flows into the Gulf of Corinth in the village Valimitika, near the town Aigio.

References

External links

Landforms of Achaea
Rivers of Greece
Rivers of Western Greece
Drainage basins of the Gulf of Corinth